Coach Trip is a British reality television game show that involves ordinary couples, with a pre-existing relationship, board a coach and travel to destinations around Europe on a 20-day tour. Those who board the coach have to try to avoid votes from the other couples on board, voting takes place at the end of each day of the trip. Series 10 began on 27 October 2014, airing weekdays at 17:30 on Channel 4, Brendan Sheerin return as tour guide, as in all previous editions. Filming took place between July and August 2014.

Contestants

Voting history

Notes

 On Day 15, it was revealed that the couple with the most votes would receive a red card. It was also revealed that no couples were immune, including Lauren and Sharran, who had joined that morning. This couple happened to be Belinda and Paul.
 On Day 17, every couple received a yellow card as some couples were being disorderly, and damaged some of the hotel property. This led to Laura and Alex being removed, despite the fact that they did not seem to be involved in the incident, as they were the only couple already on a yellow card. Bradley and Ottavio received a second yellow card at the vote, thus also leaving the coach.
 Bill & Carol previously appeared in series 9, but walked after only a few hours on the coach due to medical reasons.

The Trip Day-by-Day

References

2014 British television seasons
Coach Trip series
Television shows set in Germany
Television shows set in Latvia
Television shows set in Lithuania
Television shows set in Poland
Television shows set in the Netherlands
Television shows set in Yorkshire